Carlia insularis, the black-throated rainbow-skink or hooded rainbow skink, is a species of skink in the genus Carlia. It is endemic to Queensland, Australia where it is found in "eastern creeks in the Wet Tropics".

References

Carlia
Reptiles described in 1885
Endemic fauna of Australia
Skinks of Australia
Taxa named by Charles Walter De Vis